Antonio A. Mignucci (born 1964 in San Juan, Puerto Rico) is a biological oceanographer and veterinary technician specializing in the biology, management and conservation of marine mammals. He is the founder of the international non-profit conservation organization Red Caribeña de Varamientos (Caribbean Stranding Network) dedicated to the care, treatment, and rehabilitation of injured or stranded marine mammals, sea turtle and sea birds. As a scientist, Mignucci is an expert in endangered tropical marine mammals and a specialist in the West Indian manatee, and since 2009, the director of the Puerto Rico Manatee Conservation Center.

Early life and education
Antonio Mignucci was born in San Juan, Puerto Rico in 1964. Mignucci graduated with a Bachelor of Science in Zoology from Colorado State University in 1986. Subsequently, he received a Master of Arts in Marine Affairs in 1989 from the University of Rhode Island. In 1996, Mignucci received a Doctor of Philosophy in Marine Sciences in Biological Oceanography from the University of Puerto Rico at Mayagüez. He is a Post-Doctoral Fellow from the Sirenia Project affiliated with the Florida Caribbean Science Center. His doctorate research centers in marine sciences with emphasis in aquatic animal health. During his doctoral studies, he founded the international non-profit conservation organization Red Caribeña de Varamientos (Caribbean Stranding Network). In 2018, Mignucci earned an Associate of Science in Veterinary Technology from Penn Foster College. Academic positions include Assistant Professor of Biology and Environmental Sciences at the University of Puerto Rico (1996–1998), Professor of Oceanography and Environmental Sciences at the Universidad Metropolitana (1998–2005), Research Professor at the Inter American University of Puerto Rico (2009 to 2013). He is currently a full professor of marine sciences at the Inter American University of Puerto Rico at Bayamón.

Career

Research
As a scientist, Mignucci researches the biogeography, stranding and mortality of marine mammals, and studies their ecology through boat and aerial surveys, and the use of satellite transmitters. He also researches marine populations with the use of genetic tools. He is internationally recognized for his work on whales, dolphins, manatees and seals throughout the Caribbean. He has also lectured extensively in schools, universities and community-based non-profit organizations both in Puerto Rico and abroad. Mignucci serves as consultant to different public and private organizations on the development of holding facilities and on husbandry techniques for marine species, particularly manatees. He has also been scientific advisor to aquaria and research laboratories throughout the West Indies, Central and South America on medical treatment and husbandry techniques for captive manatees. In doing so, he has traveled extensively in the US, Caribbean, South America, Europe and Japan. He actively serves as environmental consultant to government agencies and private corporations throughout the world, on marine wildlife studies and recovery efforts of endangered species.

Publications
Mignucci has published extensively authoring with colleagues over 60 peer-reviewed publications in scientific journals He published his first book titled "El manatí de Puerto Rico," which details the natural history of Caribbean manatees in this tropical island. His second book was a children's book titled "Aunque viva en el agua," and his third book was an edited scientific compilation of conservation methods for manatees and dugongs around the world titled "Sirenian conservation: Issues and strategies in developing countries."

Community education and outreach
Through the Caribbean Stranding Network, Mignucci has applied his scientific and research experience on oceans and marine wildlife to outreach and community educational programs in Puerto Rico. He is the author of didactic materials, both in video, multimedia and printed formats, on information and conservation awareness about our seas and endangered marine wildlife. In 1994, he co-authored with the late singer Tony Croatto the song and video "Moisés llego del Mar" about manatees and their protection. The song became a symbol for wildlife conservation in Puerto Rico.

Since 1994, he is an executive member of the Sirenian Specialist Group of the IUCN-The World Conservation Union in Gland, Switzerland. His work was featured throughout the globe in the Earthpulse II television series of the National Geographic Channel, broadcast in 2002 and 2003, in ABC-TV's program Ocean Mysteries with Jeff Corwin in 2013, and PBS and England's Channel 4 program Born in the Wild in 2014.

Honors and awards
In 2004, he was awarded the Citizen of the Year Award by the Puerto Rico Environmental Quality Board, and the Environmental Quality Award by the US Environmental Protection Agency in New York City.

See also

 List of Puerto Ricans
 Corsican immigration to Puerto Rico
List of Puerto Rican scientists and inventors
University of Puerto Rico at Mayaguez people

References

External links
 Profile of Antonio A. Mignucci, ManatiPR.org
 .:: Universia Puerto Rico - El portal de los universitarios ::.
 
 » Primera Hora
 Universia Puerto Rico
 En memoria de los manatíes fallecidos - CienciaPR
 Cattle Identification: News & Information
 Trichechus manatus (American Manatee, West Indian Manatee)
 UNIVERSIA.pr

1964 births
Living people
Colorado State University alumni
University of Rhode Island alumni
University of Puerto Rico alumni
People from San Juan, Puerto Rico
Puerto Rican people of Corsican descent
Puerto Rican scientists